Agonopterix oinochroa is a moth of the family Depressariidae. It is found in France, Spain, Germany, Austria, Switzerland, Italy, the Czech Republic, Slovakia, Hungary and North Macedonia.

The wingspan is 14–18 mm.

The larvae feed on Pimpenella saxifraga, Daucus carota and Sium latifolium.

References

External links 
lepiforum.de

Moths described in 1879
Agonopterix
Moths of Europe